Bhagirathi Parbat I (Hindi: भागीरथी पर्वत I) is the highest peak of the Bhagirathi Massif of the Garhwal Himalayas in Uttarakhand, India. It is the 62nd highest peak in India and 393rd in the world. The summit is 6856 meter high (22493 feet). It was first climbed by a Japanese team in 1980.

Climbing history

It was first climbed by a Japanese expedition team via its south east ridge in 1980. They used around 2000 m rope for fixing and technical climbing. The second climb happened in 1983 by a British team led by Martin Moran and his three friend John Mothersele, Charlie Heard and Kevin Flint via west ridge. On 21 August, Martin Moran and Charlie Heard reached the summit around 4.30 pm; the next day, on 22 August, Charlie Heard died from a fall while abseiling.

Neighboring and subsidiary peaks
Bhagirathi Parbat I neighboring or subsidiary peaks: 
 Satopanth, 7,075 m (23,212 ft), 
 Vasuki Parbat, 6,792 m (22,283 ft), 
 Bhagirathi Parbat III, 6,454 m (21175 ft)
 Swachhand, 6,721 m (22051 ft)
 Chaukhamba I, 7,138 m (23419 ft)
 Mandani Parbat, 6,193 m (21175 ft)

Glaciers and rivers
The peak is flanked by the Gangotri Glacier in the west and Vasuki Glacier in the east. From the snout of Gangotri Glacier emerges Bhagirathi river, more commonly known as the Ganga or Ganges.

References

Mountains of Uttarakhand
Six-thousanders of the Himalayas
Geography of Chamoli district